Gil Gonzalo Garrido Jr. (born June 26, 1941) is a former  infielder in Major League Baseball, playing mainly at shortstop for two different teams between the  and  seasons.
 
Born in Panama City, Panama, Garrido is the son of Negro league baseball player Gil Garrido Sr. Garrido was 22 years old when he entered the majors in 1964 with the San Francisco Giants, playing for them one year before joining the Atlanta Braves (1968–1972).  His most productive season came in 1970, when he posted career numbers in games (101), batting average (.264), runs (38), RBI (19), hits (97) and extra bases (10). He also appeared in the 1969 NLCS won by the New York Mets over Atlanta, 3–0, and went 2-for-10.

In a six-season career, Garrido was a .237 hitter (207-for-872) with one home run and 51 RBI in 334 games, including 81 runs, 14 doubles, one triple, and two stolen bases.

Garrido also played from 1960 through 1968 in the San Francisco (1960–1965) and Atlanta (1966–1968) Minor league systems. In parts of nine seasons, he hit .266 with 18 homers and 328 RBI in 1177 games.

Fact
On May 27, 1970 at Atlanta Stadium, Garrido connected for his only major league home run against Houston Astros pitcher Denny Lemaster .

See also
1969 Atlanta Braves season
List of players from Panama in Major League Baseball

References

External links
The Baseball Cube
Baseball Reference
Retrosheet

 

1941 births
Living people
Artesia Giants players
Atlanta Braves players
Fresno Giants players
Major League Baseball shortstops
Major League Baseball players from Panama
Panamanian expatriate baseball players in the United States
Phoenix Giants players
Richmond Braves players
San Francisco Giants players
Sportspeople from Panama City
Tacoma Giants players